is a Japanese kickboxer, currently competing Shootboxing and KNOCK OUT. He is the former Shootboxing Japan lightweight champion.

Kickboxing career

Early career
Nishioka made his professional debut against Kento Koga at SHOOT BOXING YOUNG CEASER CUP CENTARL #13 on May 17, 2015. He lost the fight by unanimous decision. Nishioka next faced Kanade Nakai at DEEP☆KICK 26 on July 26, 2015. He won the fight by a second-round technical knockout. Nishioka extended his winning streak to two fights, after beating Asahi Hinuma by unanimous decision at SHOOT BOXING 2015～SB30th Anniversary～ act.4 on September 19, 2015. His winning streak was snapped by Toyozo Suzuki, who beat him by knockout at SHOOT BOXING YOUNG CEASER CUP CENTARL #15 on November 1, 2015.

After suffering his second professional loss, Nishioka was booked to face Yusuke Fumiyama at HIGHSPEED EX on May 22, 2016. He won the fight by unanimous decision, with scores of 29–27, 29–28 and 30–27. Nishioka faced another opponent outside of Shootboxing, as he faced Susumu Yoshida at DEEP☆KICK30 on June 17, 2016. He won the fight by a second-round knockout. 

Nishioka faced YUSHI at SHOOT BOXING OSAKA 2016 “ALPINISME vol.1” on August 13, 2016, in his return to Shootboxing. He won the fight by a second-round knockout. Nishioka was scheduled to face GG Ito at SHOOT BOXING 2017 Young Cesar act.1 on March 11, 2017. He won the fight by a dominant unanimous decision, with all three judges scoring the fight 30–24 in his favor. He won the fight by a second-round technical knockout. Nishioka re-matched YUSHI at SHOOT BOXING 2017 act.3 on June 16, 2016. He won the fight by a second-round technical knockout.

Nishioka was booked to face Akinori in a DEEP KICK lightweight title eliminator at DEEP☆KICK 33 on July 16, 2017. He won the fight by a first-round technical knockout. Nishioka knocked Akinori down early on in the first round, and knocked him down a further two times by the 1:52 minute mark, when the referee waved the fight off. Before challenging for the DEEP KICK title, Nishioka faced Kazuya Ueda at SHOOT BOXING 2017 act.4 on September 16, 2017. He won the fight by unanimous decision. Nishioka challenged the DEEP KICK lightweight champion Atsushi YAMATO at DEEP☆KICK 34 on December 17, 2017. He lost the fight by unanimous decision, with scores of 30–28, 29–28 and 30–29.

Shootboxing lightweight champion

Title reign
Nishioka challenged the Shootboxing Japan lightweight champion Kiyoaki Murata at SHOOT BOXING2018 act.4 on September 15, 2018. Nishioka won the closely contested bout by split decision, after two extension rounds were contested.

Nishioka face the ISKA Muay Thai Intercontinental Super Lightweight champion Haruaki Otsuki in a non-title bout at SHOOT BOXING S-cup 65kg World TOURNAMENT 2018 on November 18, 2018. He won the fight by unanimous decision, with scores of 28–27, 28–26 and 28–26.

Nishioka was booked to face the reigning KNOCK OUT Super Lightweight and RISE lightweight champion Fukashi Mizutani in a non-title bout at SHOOT BOXING 2019 act.2 on April 27, 2019. He won the fight by unanimous decision.

Nishioka faced Yuki Masui at SHOOT BOXING 2019 act.3 on June 23, 2019. He won the fight by unanimous decision. Nishioka next faced Masa Sato at SHOOT BOXING 2019 act.4 on September 28, 2019. He won the fight by unanimous decision, with all three judges scoring the bout 49–48 in his favor. Nishioka's six-fight winning streak was snapped by Hikaru Machida at SHOOT BOXING GROUND ZERO TOKYO 2019 on December 3, 2019, who beat him by unanimous decision.

KNOCK OUT Grand Prix
On January 20, 2020, KNOCK OUT announced Nishioka as one of the eight participants in the upcoming one-day KNOCK OUT 64kg Grand Prix, which was held at KNOCK OUT CHAMPIONSHIP.1 on February 11, 2020. He was scheduled to face Sho Ogawa in the tournament quarterfinals. The fight was ruled a draw, after the first three rounds were contested, which resulted in an extension round. Nishioka won the fourth round by split decision.

Nishioka advanced to the tournament semifinals, where he faced Chihiro Suzuki. He won the fight by unanimous decision, with two judges scoring the bout 30–29 in his favor, while the third judge awarded him a 30–29 scorecard. Nishioka faced Bazooka Koki in the tournament finals. He won the third and final fight of the day by unanimous decision, with scores of 30–29, 29–28 and 29–28.

Later title reign
Nishioka participated in the 2020 RISE Dead of Alive lightweight tournament, which was held on November 20, 2020. He was scheduled to face the reigning RISE Lightweight champion Kento Haraguchi in the tournament semifinals. Haraguchi won the fight through a dominant unanimous decision.

Nishioka made his first SHOOT BOXING lightweight title defense against Hiroki Kasahara at SHOOT BOXING 2022 act.2 on April 10, 2022. He lost the fight and his title by knockout in the second round from a body shot.

Continued lightweight career
Nishioka faced the undefeated Hiroki Suzuki at KNOCK OUT 2022 vol. 6 on October 16, 2022, in a -64 kg catchweight bout. He won the fight by unanimous decision, with two scorecards of 30–28 and one scorecard of 30–29.

Titles and accomplishments

Amateur
 2014 TOP RUN -65kg Champion
 2014 All Japan Shoot Boxing Junior -65kg Champion

Professional
Shoot boxing
2018 SHOOT BOXING Japan Lightweight Champion

KNOCK OUT
 2020 KNOCK OUT Grand Prix -64kg Winner

Fight record

|- bgcolor="#cfc"
| 2022-10-16|| Win ||align=left| Hiroki Suzuki|| KNOCK OUT 2022 Vol. 6 || Tokyo, Japan ||Decision (Unanimous) || 3 || 3:00
|-
|- bgcolor="#FFBBBB"
| 2022-04-10|| Loss ||align=left| Hiroki Kasahara||SHOOT BOXING 2022 act.2|| Tokyo, Japan || KO (Left hook to the body)|| 2 || 1:24
|-
! style=background:white colspan=9 |
|-  style="text-align:center; background:#fbb;"
| 2020-10-11|| Loss ||align=left| Kento Haraguchi|| RISE DEAD OR ALIVE 2020 Yokohama, Semi Final||  Yokohama, Japan || Decision (Unanimous) || 3 || 3:00
|- bgcolor="#cfc"
| 2020-02-11||Win ||align=left| Bazooka Koki ||KNOCK OUT CHAMPIONSHIP.1, -64kg -64kg Grand Prix Final || Tokyo, Japan ||Decision (Unanimous) ||3 || 3:00 
|-
! style=background:white colspan=9 |
|- bgcolor="#cfc"
| 2020-02-11||Win ||align=left| Chihiro Suzuki ||KNOCK OUT CHAMPIONSHIP.1, -64kg Grand Prix Semi Finals || Tokyo, Japan ||Decision (Unanimous) ||3 || 3:00
|- bgcolor="#cfc"
| 2020-02-11||Win ||align=left| Sho Ogawa ||KNOCK OUT CHAMPIONSHIP.1, -64kg -64kg Grand Prix Quarter Finals || Tokyo, Japan ||Ext.R Decision (Split) || 4 || 3:00
|- bgcolor="#FFBBBB"
| 2019-12-03|| Loss ||align=left| Hikaru Machida ||SHOOT BOXING GROUND ZERO TOKYO 2019|| Tokyo, Japan || Decision (Unanimous) || 3|| 3:00
|- bgcolor="#CCFFCC"
| 2019-09-28|| Win ||align=left| Masa Sato ||SHOOT BOXING 2019 act.4|| Tokyo, Japan || Decision (Majority) || 3 || 3:00
|- bgcolor="#CCFFCC"
| 2019-06-23|| Win ||align=left| Yuki Masui||SHOOT BOXING 2019 act.3|| Tokyo, Japan ||Decision (Unanimous)|| 3 || 3:00
|- bgcolor="#CCFFCC"
| 2019-04-27|| Win ||align=left| Fukashi || SHOOT BOXING 2019 act.2 || Tokyo, Japan || Decision (Unanimous) || 3 || 3:00
|- bgcolor="#CCFFCC"
| 2018-11-18|| Win ||align=left| Haruaki Otsuki||SHOOT BOXING S-cup 65kg World TOURNAMENT 2018	|| Tokyo, Japan ||Decision (Unanimous)|| 3 || 3:00
|- bgcolor="#CCFFCC"
| 2018-09-15|| Win ||align=left| Kiyoaki Murata||SHOOT BOXING 2018 act.4|| Tokyo, Japan ||2nd Ext.R Decision (Split)|| 7 || 3:00
|-
! style=background:white colspan=9 |
|- bgcolor="#CCFFCC"
| 2018-06-10|| Win ||align=left| Possible K ||SHOOT BOXING 2018 act.3|| Tokyo, Japan ||Decision (Unanimous)|| 3 || 3:00
|- bgcolor="#FFBBBB"
| 2017-12-17|| Loss ||align=left| Atsushi YAMATO ||DEEP☆KICK 34|| Osaka, Japan ||Decision (Unanimous)|| 3 || 3:00
|-
! style=background:white colspan=9 |
|- bgcolor="#CCFFCC"
| 2017-09-16|| Win ||align=left| Kazuya Ueda ||SHOOT BOXING 2017 act.4	|| Tokyo, Japan ||Decision (Unanimous)|| 3 || 3:00
|- bgcolor="#CCFFCC"
| 2017-07-16|| Win ||align=left| Akinori ||DEEP☆KICK 33|| Osaka, Japan ||TKO (Punches) || 1 || 1:52
|- bgcolor="#CCFFCC"
| 2017-06-16|| Win ||align=left| YUSHI || SHOOT BOXING 2017 act.3|| Tokyo, Japan ||TKO (Knee)|| 2 || 2:01
|- bgcolor="#CCFFCC"
| 2017-05-13|| Win ||align=left| Super Anji || SHOOT BOXING 2017 Young Cesar act.2|| Tokyo, Japan ||TKO (Left Hook)|| 2 || 3:00
|- bgcolor="#CCFFCC"
| 2017-03-11|| Win ||align=left| GG Ito || SHOOT BOXING 2017 Young Cesar act.1	|| Tokyo, Japan ||Decision (Unanimous)|| 3 || 3:00
|- bgcolor="#CCFFCC"
| 2016-08-13|| Win ||align=left| YUSHI || SHOOT BOXING OSAKA 2016 “ALPINISME vol.1”|| Osaka, Japan ||KO (Right Cross)|| 2 || 1:07
|- bgcolor="#CCFFCC"
| 2016-07-17|| Win ||align=left| Susumu Yoshida || DEEP☆KICK30	|| Osaka, Japan ||TKO|| 2 || 0:33
|- bgcolor="#CCFFCC"
| 2016-05-22|| Win ||align=left| Yusuke Fumiyama || HIGHSPEED EX|| Osaka, Japan ||Decision (Unanimous)|| 3 || 3:00
|- bgcolor="#FFBBBB"
| 2015-11-01|| Loss ||align=left| Toyozo Suzuki|| SHOOT BOXING YOUNG CEASER CUP CENTRAL #15 || Aichi Prefecture, Japan || KO||  ||
|- bgcolor="#CCFFCC"
| 2015-09-19|| Win ||align=left| Asahi Hinuma || SHOOT BOXING 2015～SB 30th Anniversary～ act.4	|| Tokyo, Japan ||Decision (Unanimous)|| 3 || 3:00
|- bgcolor="#CCFFCC"
| 2015-07-26|| Win ||align=left| Kanade Nakai || DEEP☆KICK 26|| Osaka, Japan ||TKO (Corner Stoppage)|| 2 || 0:58
|- bgcolor="#FFBBBB"
| 2015-05-17|| Loss ||align=left| Kento Koga || SHOOT BOXING YOUNG CEASER CUP CENTRAL #13 || Aichi Prefecture, Japan || Decision (Unanimous)|| 3 || 3:00
|-
| colspan=9 | Legend:    

|-  bgcolor="#CCFFCC"
| 2014-12-21|| Win ||align=left| Hiroki Kokubo ||Amateur SHOOT BOXING|| Tokyo, Japan || TKO || 1 || 
|-
! style=background:white colspan=9 |
|-  bgcolor="#CCFFCC"
| 2014-10-05|| Win ||align=left| Ryoga Imoto ||Amateur SHOOT BOXING|| Tokyo, Japan || Decision (Unanimous) || 2 || 2:00
|-  bgcolor="#CCFFCC"
| 2014-09-28|| Win ||align=left| Ken Ishihashi ||NEXT LEVEL|| Osaka, Japan || Decision (Unanimous) || 2 || 2:00
|-
! style=background:white colspan=9 |
|-  bgcolor="#CCFFCC"
| 2014-06-15|| Win ||align=left| Yuki Mitsuyasu ||NEXT LEVEL 15|| Osaka, Japan || TKO || 2 ||
|-  bgcolor="#CCFFCC"
| 2014-04-20|| Win ||align=left| Kota Hirayama ||Amateur SHOOT BOXING|| Osaka, Japan ||  Decision (Unanimous) || 3 || 2:00
|-  bgcolor="#CCFFCC"
| 2014-04-20|| Win ||align=left| Hiroki Kasahara ||Amateur SHOOT BOXING|| Osaka, Japan || Ext.R Decision (Unanimous) || 4 || 2:00
|-  bgcolor="#FFBBBB"
| 2014-03-16|| Loss ||align=left| Yuuma Yamatake||NEXT LEVEL Kansai 15|| Osaka, Japan || Decision (Majority) || 2 || 2:00
|-  bgcolor="#c5d2ea"
| 2013-12-01|| Draw||align=left| Kensei Kondo ||NEXT LEVEL Kansai 11|| Sakai, Japan || Decision  || 2 || 2:00
|-  bgcolor="#FFBBBB"
| 2013-11-16|| Loss||align=left| Ayato Ando ||SHOOT BOXING GROUND ZERO TOKYO 2013|| Tokyo, Japan || Decision (Unanimous) || 2 || 2:00
|-
! style=background:white colspan=9 |
|-  bgcolor="#c5d2ea"
| 2013-10-20|| Draw||align=left| Taiki Sawatani ||NEXT LEVEL Kansai 10|| Osaka, Japan || Decision (Majority) || 2 || 2:00
|-  bgcolor="#cfc"
| 2013-07-07|| Win ||align=left| Atsushi Hatake ||NEXT LEVEL Kansai 8|| Sakai, Japan || Decision (Unanimous) || 2 || 2:00
|-  bgcolor="#cfc"
| 2013-06-16|| Win||align=left| Yoshihito Kawafuji ||Amateur Shootboxing || Osaka, Japan || Decision  ||  ||
|-  bgcolor="#fbb"
| 2013-04-14|| Loss||align=left| Daichi Tanazawa ||Amateur SHOOT BOXING|| Tokyo, Japan || KO (Right hook) || 2 ||
|-  bgcolor="#CCFFCC"
| 2013-02-24|| Win ||align=left| Shintaro Miyamoto ||Amateur SHOOT BOXING|| Tokyo, Japan || KO (High kick) || 1 ||
|-  bgcolor="#FFBBBB"
| 2012-12-16|| Loss||align=left| Yuto Shinohara ||NEXT☆LEVEL Kansai 3|| Osaka, Japan || TKO || 1 || 1:17
|-  bgcolor="#FFBBBB"
| 2012-09-23|| Loss||align=left| Tsukasa Nijou ||NEXT☆LEVEL 1|| Osaka, Japan || Decision (Unanimous) || 2 || 2:00
|-  bgcolor="#CCFFCC"
| 2012-07-08|| Win ||align=left| Aso Ishiwaki ||DEEP☆KICK 12|| Osaka, Japan || Decision (Unanimous) || 2 || 2:00
|-  bgcolor="#CCFFCC"
| 2012-06-17|| Win ||align=left| Junichi Nakagawa ||KAKUMEI KICKBOXING|| Osaka, Japan || Decision (Unanimous) || 2 || 2:00
|-  bgcolor="#FFBBBB"
| 2012-05-06|| Loss ||align=left| Masahiro Satomi||NEXT LEVEL|| Osaka, Japan || Decision (Unanimous) || 2 || 2:00
|-
| colspan=9 | Legend:

References

Living people
1999 births
Japanese male kickboxers
Sportspeople from Osaka Prefecture